The FC Basel 1905–06 season was their thirteenth season since the club was formed. The club's chairman was Ernst-Alfred Thalmann, who was chairman for the third consecutive year, in his third presidential term. FC Basel played their home games in the Landhof in the district Basel-Wettstein in Kleinbasel, Basel.

Overview 
Daniel Hug was team captain and as captain he led the team trainings and was responsible for the line-ups. Basel played six pre-season friendlies, three at home in the Landhof and three away. Two of the teams that Basel hosted were from Germany Freiburger FC and 1. FC Pforzheim. During the winter break the team travelled to Germany to play an away game against Mannheimer FG 1896. They also travelled to Italy and played twice against Genoa CFC, winning 5–1 on New Years Eve and 5–4 on New Years day. After the league season the team again travelled to Italy and played twice against AC Milan, winning 5–2 on Easter Sunday and 5–1 on Easter Monday.

The Swiss Serie A season 1905–06 was divided into three regional areas, a west, a central and an eastern, where as the east was divided into two groups. Basel were allocated to the central group together with Young Boys, FC Bern and Old Boys Basel. The league was played one match in October, two in November and again one match in February and two in Match. This season was disappointing for the team, because it resulted in solely two victories from six matches. Both victories were against local rivals Old Boys. Basel ended the qualification to the finals in bottom position in the group table. In their six championship matches they scored 11 and conceded 17 goals.  Young Boys Bern qualified for the finals, which were played in April and May. East group winners won both their final pairings and became Swiss champions for the first time in the club's history.

Players  
Definite squad members

Results 
Legend

Friendly matches

Pre-season

Winter break to end of season

Serie A

Central group results

Central group league table

See also 
 History of FC Basel
 List of FC Basel players
 List of FC Basel seasons

Notes

Footnotes 

1905–1906 season matches: FCB-OB, FCB-Bern, YB-FCB, FCB-YB

References

Sources 
 Rotblau: Jahrbuch Saison 2014/2015. Publisher: FC Basel Marketing AG. 
 Switzerland 1905-06 at RSSSF
 FCB team 1905-06 at fcb-archiv.ch
(NB: Despite all efforts, the editors of these books and the authors in "Basler Fussballarchiv" have failed to be able to identify all the players, their date and place of birth or date and place of death, who played in the games during the early years of FC Basel. Most of the documentation is missing.)

External links
 FC Basel official site

FC Basel seasons
Basel